Oshkosh West High School is a public high school in Oshkosh, Wisconsin, and part of the Oshkosh Area School District. As of 2019, the school has 1,691 students in grades 9 through 12. Originally known as Oshkosh High School when the building was opened in 1961, its name was changed when Oshkosh North High School was built in 1972. The facility holds a swimming pool and two gyms, as well as the Alberta Kimball Auditorium.

Extracurricular activities
As of the 2018–2019 school year, Oshkosh West has 53 student clubs and 23 sports, 11 for males and 12 for females, all participating in the Fox Valley Association. The Oshkosh West Boys Basketball team was undefeated in 2006 and 2007, and won the state Division 1 championship both years. The Oshkosh West Girls Basketball team was the state champion for Division 1 in 2003 and 2004.

Miscellaneous
The school mascot is the Wildcat, as depicted in the school logo, in which a feline paw slashes through the capital letter "W".  The school song is "On Wisconsin". 
Prior to 2001, the school mascot was the Indian. However, because of controversy about Native American mascots, OWHS changed its mascot to the Wildcat, which was selected in a student vote.
Every November the band goes to the Oshkosh holiday parade

References

External links 
School website
School district website

Public high schools in Wisconsin
Buildings and structures in Oshkosh, Wisconsin
Educational institutions established in 1869
Schools in Winnebago County, Wisconsin
1869 establishments in Wisconsin